Tom Hall (born 1964) is an American game designer.

Tom Hall may also refer to:

Sports
Tom Hall (American football) (1940–2017), Detroit Lions, Minnesota Vikings and New Orleans Saints footballer
Tom Hall (archer) (born 1990), British archer
Tom Hall (Australian footballer) (1921–2008), Australian rules footballer
Tom Hall (baseball) (born 1947), Minnesota Twins, Cincinnati Reds, New York Mets, and Kansas City Royals baseball pitcher
Tom Hall (cricketer, born 1930) (1930–1984), Derbyshire, Somerset and MCC cricketer

Others
Tom Hall (electronic musician) (born 1980), Australian musician and multimedia artist
Tom T. Hall (1936–2021), American country singer-songwriter

See also
Tommy Hall (disambiguation)
Thomas Hall (disambiguation)